The Red Barn is a recreational facility at the Rochester Institute of Technology. Located on the west end of the RIT campus, the large, red-painted barn is the site of the university's Outdoor Education program.  It is perhaps best known for its rock climbing and bouldering facilities.

Rock climbing 

The Red Barn's  of climbing surface is spread across what was once a large top roping wall, a tower beside it, and a top-out boulder on the first floor. There is also a basement that features climbing on the ceiling. A majority of the basement wall/ceiling space are full of areas to climb, and very little square footage is wasted. The climbing holds are regularly rearranged to create new problems.

Though the Red Barn is part of the Rochester Institute of Technology Center for Intercollegiate Athletics and Recreation department, its climbing facilities are open to the public on a limited basis, with memberships and day passes offered. Non-students are charged a higher price. Climbing shoes are also available for rent.

References

External links 
 RIT Center for Intercollegiate Athletics & Recreation

Climbing areas of the United States
Rochester Institute of Technology